A Farewell to Arms is a 1957 American drama film directed by Charles Vidor. The screenplay by Ben Hecht, based in part on a 1930 play by Laurence Stallings, was the second feature film adaptation of Ernest Hemingway's 1929 semi-autobiographical novel of the same name. It was the last film produced by David O. Selznick.

An earlier film version starred Gary Cooper and Helen Hayes.

Plot
Frederick Henry (Rock Hudson) is an American officer serving in an ambulance unit for the Italian Army during World War I. While recovering from a wound in a British base hospital in northern Italy, he is cared for by Catherine Barkley (Jennifer Jones), a Queen Alexandra's Royal Army Nursing Corps nurse he had met earlier, near the front, and they engage in an affair. Frederick's friend, the doctor, convinces the army that Frederick's knee is more severely wounded than it actually is and the two continue their romance but never get married.

Catherine discovers she is pregnant but after sneaking alcohol into the hospital for Frederick, the head nurse Miss Van Campen (Mercedes McCambridge) discovers the duplicity and separates them. She informs Frederick's superiors that he has fully recovered from his wounds and is ready for active duty. During their separation, Catherine comes to believe Frederick has abandoned her.

Following the Battle of Caporetto, Frederick and his close friend Major Alessandro Rinaldi (Vittorio De Sica) are among the dispirited and retreating Italian army. Along the path or the retreat, several people die or are left behind due to exhaustion. Raving with illness, exhaustion and depression, Major Rinaldi professes defeatism with the pair arrested by the Carabinieri. A drumhead court-martial sentences Rinaldi to execution by firing squad that is immediately carried out. After Frederick tries to argue in defense of Rinaldi and makes the Italian salute incorrectly (as is his habit), the court-martial judge becomes suspicious that Frederick is also an infiltrator; he knocks out the kerosene lamps and flees, jumping into the river.

Wanted by the Italian authorities, Frederick evades capture and meets up with Catherine. They flee Milan to hide out on a lake on the Italian-Swiss border (Lake Lugano or Lake Maggiore). Fearing arrest by the police, Catherine persuades Frederick to flee to Switzerland by rowboat; after some adventures, they land successfully in Switzerland. Claiming to be tourists trying to evade the war, the two are allowed to remain in neutral Switzerland. Catherine's pregnancy progresses and all appears well, but when the time comes for her to deliver the baby, the labor is protracted and ultimately a Cesarean section is necessary.  Their child is stillborn, and Catherine dies shortly afterward of a hemorrhage. Frederick leaves, shocked, and wanders the empty streets.

Cast
 Rock Hudson as Frederick Henry
 Jennifer Jones as Catherine Barkley
 Vittorio De Sica as Major Alessandro Rinaldi
 Oskar Homolka as Dr. Emerich
 Mercedes McCambridge as Miss Van Campen
 Elaine Stritch as Helen Ferguson
 Kurt Kasznar as Bonello
 Victor Francen as Colonel Valentini  
 Franco Interlenghi as Aymo  
 Leopoldo Trieste as Passini  
 José Nieto as Major Stampi (as Jose Nieto)  
 Georges Bréhat as Captain Bassi (as Georges Brehat)  
 Johanna Hofer as Mrs. Zimmerman  
 Eduard Linkers as Lieutenant Zimmerman  
 Eva Kotthaus as Delivery Room Nurse  
 Alberto Sordi as Father Galli
 Joan Shawlee as Blonde Nurse

Production
For many years, David O. Selznick had wanted to film the Hemingway novel, but Warner Bros. owned the property and refused to sell it to him. He found himself in an advantageous bargaining position when Warner Bros. bought the remake rights to A Star is Born, to which he owned the foreign rights. Without them, the studio could not release their intended remake with Judy Garland overseas. Selznick offered to relinquish his rights to Star in exchange for the rights to Farewell, and Warner Bros. agreed. It was to be Selznick's first film in four years.

On October 25, 1956, Selznick contacted director John Huston at the Blue Haven Hotel in Tobago and enthusiastically welcomed him to the project. He advised him his contract with 20th Century Fox called for severe financial penalties if the film went over schedule and/or budget, and urged him to concentrate wholly on the film until principal filming was completed. Selznick's concerns increased as Huston began to tinker with the script and spend an inordinate amount of time on pre-production preparations, and on March 19, 1957, he sent the director a lengthy memo outlining the problems he foresaw arising from Huston's lack of cooperation. Two days later, Huston announced he could not agree with Selznick on any of the issues he had raised and quit the project. Based on correspondence to Charles Vidor, it appears the producer's relationship with Huston's replacement was acrimonious as well. The producer later said the film was "not one of the jobs of which I am most proud." During the course of production, Selznick sent over 10,000 memos.

The film was shot on location in the Italian Alps, Venzone in the Province of Udine in the region of Friuli-Venezia Giulia, Lazio, and Rome. It was budgeted at $4,100,000, $4.2 million or $4,353,000. Selznick's wife Jennifer Jones was cast in the lead role.

According to Carlos Baker's 1969 biography Ernest Hemingway: A Life Story, the Nobel Laureate was informed by Selznick that he would receive a $50,000 bonus from any profits the movie made. Unhappy at Selznick's nepotistic decision to cast his nearly 40-year-old wife as a character intended to be in her early 20s, he wrote back "If, by some chance your movie, which features the 38-year-old Mrs. Selznick as 24-year-old Catherine Barkley, does succeed in earning $50,000, I suggest that you take all of that money down to the local bank, have it converted to nickels, and then shove them up your ass until they come out your mouth.". A. E. Hotchner also refer this anecdote in his 2018 book Papa Hemingway: A Personal Memoir.

Release
The film had its premiere at Grauman's Chinese Theatre in Los Angeles on December 18, 1957. It also opened at 7 other Los Angeles theaters and 44 theaters throughout California before expanding in 1958.

Reception

Critical response
Hemingway's intuition proved correct as A Farewell To Arms opened to low box office receipts and harsh negative reviews after it premiered in 1957. The film would be forgotten by the moviegoing public as an epic in later years. In his review in The New York Times, Bosley Crowther noted, "Mr. Selznick's picture . . . lacks that all-important awareness of the inescapable presence and pressure of war. That key support to the structure of the theme has been largely removed by Ben Hecht's script and by a clear elimination of subtle thematic overtones . . . [it] is a tedious account of a love affair between two persons who are strangely insistent upon keeping it informal . . . as a pure romance . . . it has shortcomings. The essential excitement of a violent love is strangely missing in the studied performances that Rock Hudson and Jennifer Jones give in the leading roles. Mr. Hudson is most noticeably unbending, as if he were cautious and shy, but Miss Jones plays the famous Catherine Barkley with bewildering nervous moves and grimaces. The show of devotion between two people is intensely acted, not realized. It is questionable, indeed, whether Mr. Hudson and Miss Jones have the right personalities for these roles." The New York Herald Tribune was vitriolic in its review of the film.

TV Guide calls it "an overblown Hollywood extravaganza that . . . hasn't improved with age . . . the chief virtue of this hollow epic is the stupendous color photography of the Italian Alps . . . also enjoyable is Vittorio De Sica's inspired performance as the wily Maj. Rinaldi, but it's not enough to offset the flagrant overacting by Jones and the woodenness of Hudson."

Time Out New York describes it as an "inflated remake" with "surplus production values and spectacle" and adds, "A padded Ben Hecht script and Selznick's invariable tendency to overkill are equally to blame."

In his review of the DVD release, Jeremiah Kipp of Slant Magazine awarded the film two out of a possible five stars and stated, "To those willing to endure A Farewell To Arms: Don't be a hero! . . . We have David O. Selznick to blame for this bloated two-hour-plus Technicolor remake, announcing from the larger-than-life opening credits set against epic shots of sunsets, mountains, and valleys that he's aiming for another Gone with the Wind . . . without compelling lovers at the heart of his grand-scale love story, it's all just a meaningless protracted spectacle."

After this film, David O. Selznick left the movies completely, producing no other films.

Box office
The movie grossed $87,000 in its opening week in Los Angeles from 8 theaters. It earned an estimated $5 million in theatrical rentals in the United States and Canada and by the end of 1958 had made worldwide rentals of $6.9 million. Fox made some money on the movie but Selznick did not recover his costs.

Awards and nominations
Vittorio De Sica was nominated for the Academy Award for Best Supporting Actor but lost to Red Buttons for Sayonara.

See also
 List of American films of 1957

References

Further reading
 Tibbetts, John C., and James M. Welsh, eds. The Encyclopedia of Novels Into Film (2nd ed. 2005) pp 124–126.

External links

 
 
 

 
 

1957 films
1957 romantic drama films
American romantic drama films
1950s English-language films
War romance films
World War I films set on the Italian Front
Films based on works by Ernest Hemingway
Films based on American novels
Films set in Italy
20th Century Fox films
Films directed by Charles Vidor
Films produced by David O. Selznick
Films with screenplays by Ben Hecht
Films scored by Mario Nascimbene
CinemaScope films
1950s American films